Louise Wallace (born 1983) is a New Zealand poet.

Background 
Louise Wallace was born in Gisborne, New Zealand, in 1983. She received a BA from Victoria University of Wellington in 2004 and an MA in creative writing at the International Institute of Modern Letters (Victoria University of Wellington) in 2008.

Works 
Wallace's writing explores family stories and relationships, travel, and music.

Her poems have appeared in many literary journals, including Akzente, Landfall, Meanjin, Snorkel, Sport, and Turbine. Her work has also been published in the Best New Zealand Poems series (2009 and 2011) and Essential New Zealand Poems: Facing the Empty Page (2014).

Collected works of poems by Wallace include:
 Since June (Victoria University Press, 2009)
 Enough (Victoria University Press, 2013)
 Bad Things (Victoria University Press, 2017)
Wallace is the founder and editor of Starling, a literary journal showcasing young New Zealand writers.

Wallace has taught creative writing at Massey University and the Nelson Marlborough Institute of Technology.

Awards 
In 2015, Wallace received  the Robert Burns Fellowship, a literary residency with the University of Otago in Dunedin, New Zealand. While at Victoria University of Wellington, she was awarded the Biggs Prize for Poetry .

References

Further reading 
Interviews with Louise Wallace on Radio NZ discussing Enough and Since June

1983 births
Living people
New Zealand women poets
International Institute of Modern Letters alumni
People from Gisborne, New Zealand